Jonathan Mark Pearce (born May 1, 1992) is an American mixed martial artist who competes in the Featherweight division of the Ultimate Fighting Championship.

Background
Having begun wrestling at the age of 12, Pearce was a state runner-up wrestler at Science Hill High School.

In 2014, Pearce was blindsided by a disgruntled gym member, after the gym “bully” clocked him from behind after Pearce called out his ongoing rude behavior. Pearce went unconscious and had his head bashed by a heavy follow-up kick. The attack caused Pearce to suffer a broken neck, 19 broken teeth, a severed tongue, and had to undergo reconstructive jaw surgery. He still has two plates and eight screws in his face. After the incident, Pearce dropped out of college in pursuit of a professional mixed martial arts career.

Mixed martial arts career

Early career 
In his MMA debut at CFFC 73, he knocked out Noe Quintanilla in the third round, going on to defeat his next three opponents in Chris Wright, Anthony Morgan, and Nickalas Martino.

After going 4–0 to start his career, his fiancée called off their wedding and he would lose the next three bouts, two by first round submission. Also after the third straight loss, in 2017, Pearce went to get medicals done for his next fight and doctors discovered he had a clay-shoveler fracture of two vertebrae in his neck, likely from the 2015 attack. A clay-shoveler fracture is an avulsion in which a small piece of bone tears away from the bigger piece.

He would defeat his next two opponents in Nick Baker and Dedrek Sanders, both via second round TKO.

Dana White's Contender Series
He took on Jacob Rosales and defeated him via TKO in the third round and securing a UFC contract.

Ultimate Fighting Championship
Pearce made his UFC debut against UFC vet Joe Lauzon, who was coming off a 18 month hiatus, at UFC on ESPN: Reyes vs. Weidman. He lost the fight via technical knockout in round one.

Pearce was scheduled to face Sean Woodson on November 28, 2020 at UFC on ESPN: Smith vs. Clark. However, Woodson withdrew a week before the event due to unknown reasons and was replaced by Kai Kamaka III. He won the bout via TKO in the second round.

Pearce was scheduled to face Gabriel Benítez on May 1, 2021 at UFC on ESPN: Reyes vs. Procházka.At weigh ins,  Benítez weighed in at 150.5 pounds, 4.5 pounds over the featherweight non-title limit. Pearce turned down the fight due to the weight miss and the bout was scrapped.

Pearce faced Omar Morales on September 25, 2021 at UFC 266. He won the fight via rear-naked choke in round two.

Pearce was scheduled to face Austin Lingo on February 19, 2022 at UFC Fight Night 201. However, Lingo pulled out due to undisclosed reasons, and was replaced by Christian Rodriguez. Pearce won the fight via unanimous decision.

Pearce faced Makwan Amirkhani on July 23, 2022, at UFC Fight Night 208. He won the bout via TKO in the second round. This win earned him the Performance of the Night award.

Pearce faced Darren Elkins on December 3, 2022, at UFC on ESPN 42. He won the bout via unanimous decision.

Pearce is scheduled to face  Bryce Mitchell on May 6, 2023, at UFC 288.

Championships and accomplishments
Ultimate Fighting Championship
 Performance of the Night (One time)

Mixed martial arts record

|-
|Win
|align=center|14–4
|Darren Elkins
|Decision (unanimous)
|UFC on ESPN: Thompson vs. Holland
|
|align=center|3
|align=center|5:00
|Orlando, Florida, United States
|
|-
|Win
|align=center|13–4
|Makwan Amirkhani
|TKO (punches)
|UFC Fight Night: Blaydes vs. Aspinall 
|
|align=center|2
|align=center|4:10
|London, England
|
|-
|Win
|align=center|12–4
|Christian Rodriguez
|Decision (unanimous)
|UFC Fight Night: Walker vs. Hill
|
|align=center|3
|align=center|5:00
|Las Vegas, Nevada, United States
|
|-
|Win
|align=center| 11–4
|Omar Morales
|Submission (rear-naked choke)
|UFC 266
|
|align=center|2
|align=center|3:31
|Las Vegas, Nevada, United States
|
|-
| Win
| align=center| 10–4
| Kai Kamaka III
|TKO (punches)
|UFC on ESPN: Smith vs. Clark
|
|align=center| 2
|align=center| 4:28
|Las Vegas, Nevada, United States
|
|-
| Loss
| align=center| 9–4
| Joe Lauzon
|TKO (punches)
|UFC on ESPN: Reyes vs. Weidman 
|
|align=center|1
|align=center|1:33
|Boston, Massachusetts, United States
| 
|-
| Win
| align=center| 9–3
| Jacob Rosales
| TKO (punch)
| Dana White's Contender Series 19
| 
| align=center| 3
| align=center| 1:50
| Las Vegas, Nevada, United States
|
|-
| Win
| align=center| 8–3
| Dedrek Sanders
| TKO (doctor stoppage)
| Warrior FC 140
| 
| align=center| 2
| align=center| 5:00
| Asheville, North Carolina, United States
|
|-
| Win
| align=center| 7–3
|Nick Baker
|TKO (punches)
|Strikefest 2
|
|align=center|2
|align=center|1:12
|Gray, Tennessee, United States
|
|-
| Win
| align=center|6–3
| Omar Johnson
|TKO (punches)
|Bellator Monster Energy Fight Series: Talladega
|
|align=center|2
|align=center|3:57
|Talladega, Alabama, United States
|
|-
| Win
| align=center|5–3
| Damir Ferhatbegović
|Submission (rear-naked choke)	
| Bellator Monster Energy Fight Series: Bristol
| 
| align=center|3
| align=center|0:43	
| Bristol, Tennessee, United States
|
|-
| Loss
| align=center| 4–3
| Peter Petties
| Decision (unanimous)
| Shogun Fights 16
| 
| align=center| 3
| align=center| 5:00
| Baltimore, Maryland, United States
| 
|-
| Loss
| align=center| 4–2
| Quinten Culpepper
| Submission (toe hold)
| Valor Fights 37
|
|align=Center|1
|align=center|3:27
|Cleveland, Tennessee, United States
| 
|-
| Loss
| align=center| 4–1
| Lance Lawrence
| Submission (rear-naked choke)
|Valor Fights 35
|
|align=center|1
|align=center|0:24
|Gray, Tennessee, United States
|
|-
| Win
| align=center| 4–0
| Nickalas Martino
| TKO (elbows)
|APEX Fights 10
|
|align=center|2
|align=center|2:52
|Kingsport, Tennessee, United States
|
|-
| Win
| align=center| 3–0
| Chris Wright
| TKO (punches)
| Valor Fights 26
| 
| align=center| 1
| align=center| 4:26
| Blountville, Tennessee, United States
| 
|-
| Win
| align=center| 2–0
| Anthony Morgan
| Decision (unanimous)
| Valor Fights 23
| 
| align=center| 3
| align=center| 5:00
| Pigeon Forge, Tennessee, United States
|
|-
| Win
| align=center| 1–0
| Noe Quintanilla
| KO (knee)
| Evolution Combat Sports Series 2
| 
| align=center| 3
| align=center| 0:22
| Elizabethton, Tennessee, United States
|

See also 
 List of current UFC fighters
 List of male mixed martial artists

References

External links 
  
  

1992 births
Living people
American male mixed martial artists
Featherweight mixed martial artists
Mixed martial artists utilizing wrestling
Mixed martial artists utilizing Brazilian jiu-jitsu
Ultimate Fighting Championship male fighters
American male sport wrestlers
Amateur wrestlers
American practitioners of Brazilian jiu-jitsu
People from Johnson City, Tennessee